M. philippensis may refer to:
 Mallotus philippensis, the kamala or red kamala, a tree species found in south east Asia
 Myristica philippensis, a plant species endemic to the Philippines